The Hi-Life Hustle is the third studio album by American rapper Hi-C from Compton, California. It was released on October 21, 2003, via Rap-A-Lot Records. The album features guest appearances from DJ Quik, Bigg Steele, E-40, Nate Dogg, Too Swift, Suga Free, Diamonique, Sly Boogy, James DeBarge, and Pryncezz.

Track listing 

Sample credits
Track 2 contains elements from "Funkin' for Fun" by Parliament (1976)
Track 4 contains elements from "Easin' In" by Edwin Starr (1974)
Track 6 contains elements from "Give Me Some of That Good Old Love" by Willie Hutch (1974)
Track 7 contains elements from "So Ruff, So Tuff" by Roger Troutman (1981) and "All Bout U" by 2Pac (1996)
Track 8 contains elements from "Mo' Pussy" by DJ Quik (1992)
Track 10 contains elements from "You're Getting a Little Too Smart" by The Detroit Emeralds (1973)
Track 17 contains elements from "Do It Roger" by Roger Troutman (1981) and "Wino & Junkie" by Richard Pryor (1974)

References

External links

2003 albums
Hi-C (rapper) albums
Rap-A-Lot Records albums
Albums produced by DJ Quik